Kenya competed at the 2019 World Championships in Athletics in Doha, Qatar, from 27 September to 6 October 2019. The country finished in 2nd place in the medal table.

Medalists

Results
(q – qualified, NM – no mark, SB – season best)

Men
Track and road events

Field events

Women
Track and road events

Mixed

Track and road events

References

Kenya
World Championships in Athletics
2019